Johnny Amadeus Cecotto, more commonly known as Johnny Cecotto Jr. (born 9 September 1989 in Augsburg, West Germany) is a racing driver. He races with a Venezuelan license but holds both German and Venezuelan nationality. He is the son of former racing driver and motorcycle world champion Johnny Cecotto.

Career

Early career 
He began his racing career in kart racing, then progressing to open wheel single seater racing. He competed in Formula BMW ADAC in 2005. In 2006 he raced in the German Formula Three Championship, taking one victory, and also in the Formula Renault 2.0 Northern European Cup. In 2007, he raced in the International Formula Master series, finishing eighth with three podiums. He returned to the German F3 Championship, finishing in third with two victories.

In 2009 he raced in the Formula Three Euroseries for the HBR Motorsport team, before the team missed races at Brands Hatch. He then signed a deal to compete in the GP2 Series, partnering Michael Herck at David Price Racing.

GP2 
He joined up with Trident Racing for the 2009–10 GP2 Asia Series season, but was replaced by Dani Clos after the first round. He returned to Trident for the 2010 Main Series and scored his first championship points at Monaco, but was replaced by Edoardo Piscopo after sixteen races.

Cecotto moved to Super Nova Racing for the 2011 GP2 Asia Series season alongside Fairuz Fauzy, and finished fifteenth in the drivers' championship. For the main series season, he switched to the Ocean Racing Technology team and was partnered with Kevin Mirocha and later Brendon Hartley, finishing 24th in the championship.

He switched to the Addax team for the 2012 season, alongside Josef Král. After a difficult start to the season, he suddenly hit form at Monaco, taking his first pole position and race victory in the category. He also won the feature race at Hockenheim after his decision to start with dry tyres on a wet but drying track paid off. Despite also posting seven retirements, the season was comfortably Cecotto's best in the series, finishing ninth in the championship as a result.

In 2013 lacked the pace he had shown in the previous year and struggled with no podiums. However he was once again quick in Monaco taking pole for the feature race, but he caused a first corner multi-car pile-up leaving him out of the race and banned from the following day's sprint race for causing the collision. Despite this he had his most consistent GP2 season with 10 points finishes ending with 41 points. He returned to Trident for 2014, he scored two victories and three further podium finishes but struggled in the latter stages, he would go on to finish a career-best 5th in the championship.

Formula One 

Cecotto was confirmed as one of the Force India team drivers to participate in the young driver test held in Yas Marina Circuit, after the 2011 Abu Dhabi Grand Prix.

In 2012, Cecotto took part in the young driver test again, this time with Toro Rosso.

Formula V8 3.5 Series 

In 2016 Cecotto moved to the Formula V8 3.5 Series with RP Motorsport. He won his first race of the season at the Hungaroring. However, after the round at Spa-Francorchamps he split with his team and was left without a ride.

Racing record

Career summary 

† As Cecotto was a guest driver at Brands Hatch and was thus ineligible for points, but he did not start in both races.
‡ Position when season was cancelled.
* Season still in progress.

Complete Formula 3 Euro Series results
(key) (Races in bold indicate pole position; races in italics indicate fastest lap)

Complete GP2 Series results 
(key) (Races in bold indicate pole position) (Races in italics indicate fastest lap)

† Driver did not finish, but was classified as he completed over 90% of the race distance.

Complete GP2 Asia Series results 
(key) (Races in bold indicate pole position) (Races in italics indicate fastest lap)

Complete Auto GP results
(key) (Races in bold indicate pole position) (Races in italics indicate fastest lap)

‡ Position when season was cancelled.

Complete Formula V8 3.5 results
(key) (Races in bold indicate pole position) (Races in italics indicate fastest lap)

† Driver did not finish, but was classified as he completed over 90% of the race distance.

Complete FIA Formula 2 Championship results
(key) (Races in bold indicate pole position) (Races in italics indicate points for the fastest lap of top ten finishers)

References

External links 
 
 
 

1989 births
Living people
Sportspeople from Augsburg
German people of Venezuelan descent
German people of Italian descent
Venezuelan people of Italian descent
Venezuelan expatriate sportspeople in Germany
Venezuelan racing drivers
Italian Formula Renault 2.0 drivers
Formula BMW ADAC drivers
Formula Renault 2.0 NEC drivers
Formula 3 Euro Series drivers
British Formula Three Championship drivers
International Formula Master drivers
Auto GP drivers
GP2 Asia Series drivers
GP2 Series drivers
World Series Formula V8 3.5 drivers
FIA Formula 2 Championship drivers
Ombra Racing drivers
Target Racing drivers
Scuderia Coloni drivers
Koiranen GP drivers
David Price Racing drivers
Trident Racing drivers
Ocean Racing Technology drivers
Super Nova Racing drivers
Campos Racing drivers
Arden International drivers
Virtuosi Racing drivers
Hilmer Motorsport drivers
Carlin racing drivers
RP Motorsport drivers
Rapax Team drivers
Italian Formula Renault 1.6 drivers
German racing drivers
Double R Racing drivers